Seo District (literally west district) is a gu, or district, in south-west central Busan, South Korea.

Administrative divisions

Seo-gu is divided into 8 legal dong, which altogether comprise 14 administrative dong, as follows:

Dongdaesin-dong/East Daesin (3 administrative dong)
Seodaesin-dong/West Daesin (3 administrative dong)
Bumin-dong
Ami-dong
Chojang-dong
Chungmu-dong
Nambumin-dong/South Bumin (3 administrative dong)
Amnam-dong

In 1998 Ami 1-dong and Ami 2-dong were merged. In 2003 Seodaesin 2-dong and Seodaesin 1-dong were merged.

Politics

The area is represented in the National Assembly by the West District and East District Busan (South Korean Legislature Constituency)

Sister cities
 Changhai, China

See also
Geography of South Korea
Subdivisions of South Korea

References

External links 

 Seo-gu website 

 
Districts of Busan